Redbone  may refer to:

Music
 Redbone (band), an American funk rock band founded in 1969 by brothers Pat and Lolly Vegas
 "Redbone" (song), recorded by American rapper and singer Childish Gambino
 Leon Redbone (1949–2019), singer-songwriter and musician specializing in jazz, blues, and Tin Pan Alley classics
 Martha Redbone (born 1966), American blues and soul singer

Other
 Redbone (ethnicity), a term historically used in much of the southern United States to denote a multiracial individual or culture
 Redbone Coonhound, an American breed of hunting dog